Drumbagh (Irish derived place name, Droim Beach meaning ‘The Hill-Ridge of the Bees’.) is a townland in the civil parish of Kildallan, barony of Tullyhunco, County Cavan, Ireland.

Geography

Drumbagh is bounded on the north by Bocade Glebe and Feugh (Bishops) townlands, on the west by Drumcartagh townland, on the south by Drummully West townland and on the east by Drumbo (Tullyhunco) townland. Its chief geographical features are small streams and a spring well. Drumbagh is traversed by minor public roads and rural lanes. The townland covers 49 acres.

History

From medieval times up to the early 1600s, the land belonged to the McKiernan Clan.

A 1629 Inquisition spells the name as Drombeach. The 1652 Commonwealth Survey spells it as Drombee.

Up until the 1650s, Drumbagh formed part of the present-day townland of Drummully West and its history is the same till then.

In the Plantation of Ulster King James VI and I by grant dated 23 July 1610 granted the Manor of Clonyn or Taghleagh, which included the two polls of Dromoligh (now comprising the townlands of Drummully East, Drummully West and Drumbagh), to Sir Alexander Hamilton of Innerwick, Scotland. On 29 July 1611 Arthur Chichester, 1st Baron Chichester and others reported that- . An Inquisition held at Cavan on 10 June 1629 stated that the 2 polls called Dromoligh are otherwise called Drumwillies and that they contained eight sub-divisions, one of which was named Drombeach. It also described the boundary of the townland as- .

The 1652 Commonwealth Survey lists the owner as Sir Francis Hamilton and describes it as wasteland.

The 1825 Tithe Applotment Books list five tithepayers in the townland.

The Drumbagh Valuation Office books are available for April 1838.

Griffith's Valuation of 1857 lists six landholders in the townland.

The landlord of Drumbagh in the 19th century was Hugh Wallace.

Census

In the 1901 census of Ireland, there were five families listed in the townland.

In the 1911 census of Ireland, there were five families listed in the townland.

References

External links
 The IreAtlas Townland Data Base

Townlands of County Cavan